Gabriela Polanska née Wojtowicz (born ) is a Polish volleyball player. She is part of the Poland women's national volleyball team.

She participated in the 2015 FIVB Volleyball World Grand Prix, and 2018 FIVB Volleyball Women's Nations League.
On club level she played for Budowlani Łódź in 2015.

References

External links

1988 births
Living people
Polish women's volleyball players
Place of birth missing (living people)